Senator Shannon may refer to:

Charles E. Shannon Jr. (1943–2005), Massachusetts State Senate
George R. Shannon (1818–1891), Texas State Senate
Thomas Bowles Shannon (1827–1897), California State Senate
Thomas Shannon (Ohio politician) (1786–1846), Ohio State Senate